H&H restaurant specializes in southern comfort food and soul food. The restaurant is located on Forsyth Street in downtown Macon, Georgia. It was opened in 1959 by Inez Hill, also known as "Mama Hill". It was co-owned by Louise Hudson ("Mama Louise").  The restaurant closed in 2013 and reopened the following year, now under the ownership of a Macon-based business called the Moonhanger Group, which owns several local restaurants.

H&H is a Macon attraction made famous by The Allman Brothers Band. Molly Hatchet and the Wet Willie Band were also regular attendees of the H&H. It has also been the meeting place for civil rights activists, the NAACP and Georgia state presidents and officers.

Menu

H&H is a soul food restaurant with a "meat and three" menu. There is an assortment of meats such as roast beef, fried chicken, smothered chicken, fried pork chops, stew beef, baked ham, Bar-B-Q Ribs, and fried fish on the menu. As is customary at traditional Southern diners and lunch counters, each day has a different choice of vegetables. Mondays feature collards, macaroni and cheese, lima beans, okra, rice, and squash. Tuesdays offer collards, corn, boiled okra, rice, snap beans, and black-eyed peas. Wednesday's lineup is a combination of collards, lima beans, rice, okra, and squash. On Thursdays collards, corn boiled okra, rice, snap beans, and black-eyed peas are on the menu. Okra, collards, squash, rice and gravy, macaroni and cheese, and lima beans are on the menu for Friday. The week closes on Saturday with collards, corn, boiled okra, rice, snap beans, and black-eyed peas. The H&H dessert menu consists of peach cobbler, apple cobbler, sweet potato pie, and bread pudding.

History
"Mama Hill" was born on October 13, 1913, in Warrenton, Georgia. She moved to Macon in 1950, when her husband began to work at Robins Air Force Base. In 1959 Inez Hill opened H&H Restaurant with her goddaughter and cousin Louise Hudson. The first location of the restaurant was at Hayes and Third Street, then moved to Cotton Avenue before finally settling at 807 Forsyth Street. The Dining room walls of H&H are covered with memorabilia and posters of The Allman Brothers Band, as well as one of the awards from their Filmore East album. The Allman Brothers Band recorded at the Capricorn records. The struggling musicians put their money together one day to share a two meals at H&H one afternoon. Mama Louise felt sorry for the hungry musicians and brought them their own individual meals and told them to pay her when they had the money. This was the beginning of their friendship; they always knew they could count of Mama Louise when times were hard. After the band became famous, they invited Mama Louise on tour with them in 1972 to California to fix their meals, however she never cooked a single thing.

Oprah at H&H
In November 2007, Oprah Winfrey came to Macon to record an episode of her television Show Oprah's Favorite Things. While in Macon, she stopped by H&H and met Mama Louise and Mama Inez. When she arrived she was surrounded by security guards and fans. She made her way through the back door of the restaurant and into the dining area. She talked with Mama Louise and Mama Inez and signed autographs and took picture with fans before leaving.

Mama Louise's birthday party
On July 8, 2007, hundreds of people gathered together to celebrate Mama Louise's Birthday at the Macon Armory Ballroom. Gregg Allman took stage and shared many stories of times the band shared at the H&H restaurant and on tour with Mama Louise. Next, American politician Jim Marshall delivered a proclamation from Washington, D.C. honoring Mama Louise as "Lady Mama Louise". Vergil Watkins, from the Mayor's office, stated that July 26 was "Mama Louise Day" in Macon. She was also given a brick that was to be placed in the Georgia Music Hall of Fame walkway, declaring Mama Louise the Mother of Southern Rock. A slide show was shown composed of pictures of Mama Louise with The Allman Brothers Band and other famous people that had visited the H&H as well as a video of people wishing her a happy birthday. To conclude the evening Johnny Sandlin, Paul Hornsby, Billy Stewart, Tommy Talton, Lee Roy Parnell, Ronnie Bartlett, and Gregg Allman joined on stage to play "These Days", "Midnight Rider", which is Mama Louises favorite song, and "Melissa".

Mama Hill's death
On December 18, 2007, Inez "Mama" Hill died. She collapsed while working at the H&H and was taken to the Medical Center of Central Georgia in Macon where doctors determined she suffered a brain aneurysm. She lived to be the mother of seven, a grandmother of sixteen, a great-grandmother, and a great-great-grandmother. Her funeral service was in Macon, but closed to the public.

See also
 List of soul food restaurants

References

Buildings and structures in Macon, Georgia
Restaurants in Georgia (U.S. state)
Tourist attractions in Macon, Georgia
Restaurants established in 1959
1959 establishments in Georgia (U.S. state)
Soul food restaurants